The San Diego Film Critics Society Award for Best Actress is an award given by the San Diego Film Critics Society to honor the finest female acting achievements in film-making.

Winners

1990s

2000s

2010s

2020s

References

 San Diego Film Critics Society - Awards

Film awards for lead actress